Interkom Kom Ind is the third studio album by the Danish rock band Nephew. Four singles have been released from the album so far: "Igen & igen &", "Science fiction & familien",  "Mexico ligger i Spanien" and "Hospital" in a live version featuring L.O.C.

Track listing
"Igen & Igen &" - 4:35
"Mexico Ligger i Spanien" - 4:53
"Cigaret Kid" - 4:19
"Taxa Triumf" - 4:25
"Science Fiction & Familien" - 4:01
"Hvidt på Sort" - 4:41
"Hospital" - 3:39
"Læsterlige Klø" - 3:53
"First Blood Harddisk" - 5:14
"Sway" - 3:16
"T-kryds" - 4:21

References

2006 albums
Nephew (band) albums